Bestrophin-2 is a protein that in humans is encoded by the BEST2 gene.

Function 

This gene is a member of the bestrophin gene family of anion channels. Bestrophin genes share a similar gene structure with highly conserved exon-intron boundaries, but with distinct 3' ends. Bestrophins are transmembrane proteins that contain a homologous region rich in aromatic residues, including an invariant arg-phe-pro motif. Mutation in one of the family members (bestrophin 1) is associated with vitelliform macular dystrophy. The bestrophin 2 gene is mainly expressed in the non-pigmented ciliary  epithelium and colon.

References

External links

Further reading

Ion channels